Chris Tierney (born July 1, 1994) is a Canadian professional ice hockey centre who currently plays for the  Montreal Canadiens of the National Hockey League (NHL). Tierney was drafted by the San Jose Sharks 55th overall in the 2012 NHL Entry Draft.

Playing career

Junior
Tierney was selected by the London Knights in the first round, 19th overall in the Ontario Hockey League's (OHL) 2010 priority selection draft. Tierney began his major junior career during the 2010–11 season with the Knights, scoring 11 points in 47 games. In his second season, Tierney played on a line with Josh Anderson and Bo Horvat, scoring 11 goals and 34 points in 65 games. The Knights won the OHL's 2012 J. Ross Robertson Cup. They went on to play in the 2012 Memorial Cup, but were defeated in the final 2–1 by the Shawinigan Cataractes.

At the 2012 NHL Entry Draft, Tierney was selected in the second round, 55th overall, by the San Jose Sharks. On April 2, 2013, the Sharks signed Tierney to a three-year, entry-level contract.

During the 2012–13 season, the Knights won the J. Ross Robertson Cup for a second time. Tierney finished the playoffs with 21 points in 21 games. The Knights lost in the semi-finals to the Portland Winterhawks during the Memorial Cup.

Tierney concluded his major junior career during the 2013–14 season. In his final year with the Knights, he was named captain. The Knights made a third consecutive trip to the Memorial Cup, this time as hosts. The Knights finished last in the tournament. He finished his Knights' career with 191 points in 247 games.

Professional
Tierney turned professional during the 2014–15 season. He made the Sharks' opening night roster and recorded his first career point (an assist) in his debut on October 8. On February 5, 2015, Tierney scored his first career NHL goal in a 5–1 win over the Vancouver Canucks. Tierney also spent time with the Sharks' American Hockey League (AHL) affiliate, the Worcester Sharks.

Tierney spent the entirety of the 2015–16 season with the Sharks, appearing in 79 games. He also played in an additional 24 games during the 2016 Stanley Cup playoffs. The Sharks reached the Stanley Cup Finals, losing to the Pittsburgh Penguins in six games. The following season he played in 80 games with the Sharks, scoring 11 goals and 23 points.

On July 11, 2017, the Sharks signed Tierney to a one-year, one-way contract extension worth $735,000. During the 2017–18 season, Tierney led all Sharks in penalty killing time on ice. He registered 17 goals and 40 points in 82 games during the regular season and two points in ten playoff games. On July 18, 2018, Tierney signed a two-year contract extension with the Sharks. Prior to the 2018–19 season, he was traded to the Ottawa Senators on September 13, 2018, as part of a package for defenceman Erik Karlsson.

During the  season, on December 14, 2018, Tierney scored two goals in a 4–2 win over the Detroit Red Wings. During the pandemic-shortened  season, Tierney finished sixth on the Senators in scoring, with 11 goals and 36 points in 71 games. On October 26, 2020, Tierney signed a two-year, $7 million contract extension with the Senators. In the  season, Tierney scored two power play goals in a 3–2 win over the Dallas Stars on October 17, 2021.

Following the conclusion of his contract with the Senators, Tierney left as a free agent and was signed to a one-year, two-way contract with the Florida Panthers on July 16, 2022. He was assigned by the Panthers to begin the  season with AHL affiliate, the Charlotte Checkers, marking the first time he returned to the AHL since 2016. Tierney registered 16 points through 20 games with the Checkers, before earning recalls to the Panthers and featuring in 13 games for 3 points. Tierney was subsequently claimed off waivers from the Panthers by the Montreal Canadiens on February 23, 2023.

Personal life
Tierney is the son of Jim and Liz Tierney. He was born in Keswick, Ontario and has family in the Ottawa area. Tierney grew up an Atlanta Thrashers fan.

Career statistics

References

External links

1994 births
Living people
Canadian expatriate ice hockey players in the United States
Canadian ice hockey centres
Charlotte Checkers (2010–) players
Florida Panthers players
London Knights players
Ice hockey people from Ontario
Montreal Canadiens players
Ottawa Senators players
People from the Regional Municipality of York
San Jose Barracuda players
San Jose Sharks draft picks
San Jose Sharks players
Worcester Sharks players